Alex Walker (born 31 July 1986, Newport) is a Welsh rugby union player. He is a Wales sevens international.

A scrum half, Walker played for Newport HSOB and Newport RFC before joining Newport Gwent Dragons. During the 2008–09 season he spent time on loan to London Welsh. He was released by Newport Gwent Dragons in August 2010 and joined Eastwood Rugby Club in Sydney, Australia. In July 2011 he joined the Scarlets.

He was selected in the Wales Sevens squad for 2012-13

After two years at Cardiff Blues, Walker joined London club Ealing Trailfinders Rugby Club, where he was subsequently named as club captain for the 2016-17 Greene King IPA Championship season.

After three years with Ealing, in June 2017 it was confirmed that Walker had signed for another London club, London Scottish FC, in a part-time professional playing role.

Walker's playing role at London Scottish was combined with a full-time school-teaching one.  Walker retired from playing professional rugby by June 2018.

In 2018 Alex Walker hoped that teaching may be a vocation that he could continue after his rugby career had finished. He was in his last year of his degree with the Open University and was aiming to complete his PGCE the following year. In 2019, Walker was a trainee teacher/rugby coach at Belmont Mill Hill Preparatory School in London.

Personal life
Alex Walker also appeared on the Channel 4 residential property search show Location, Location, Location in 2014 (Series 23 Episode 8) and again in early 2016 (Series 26 Episode 6), looking for a home in Ruislip and Hillingdon areas of west London.

References

External links
Newport Gwent Dragons profile
London Welsh profile

Living people
Welsh rugby union players
Newport HSOB RFC players
Dragons RFC players
Newport RFC players
Cardiff RFC players
Scarlets players
London Welsh RFC players
1986 births
Rugby union players from Newport, Wales
Rugby union scrum-halves